Zafir Zulfiqar Din (born 28 April 1977) is a Kenyan former first-class cricketer.

Din was born at Nairobi in April 1977. He made his only appearance in first-class cricket for Kenya against a touring England A team at Nairobi in 1998. He bowled four wicketless overs in the match with his leg break googly bowling, and was unbeaten without scoring in the Kenyan first innings. In 2011, he set up the Legend Cricket Academy based at the Jaffery Sports Club in Mombasa, alongside Steve Tikolo, Thomas Odoyo, Sibtain Kassamali, and Bapa Juma Abbas. The aim of the academy was to arrest the decline of cricket in Kenya.

References

External links

1977 births
Living people
People from Nairobi
Kenyan cricketers